Whipping Boy is the third and final studio album of the Irish band Whipping Boy. It was released on April 28, 2000 on Low Rent Records.

Track listing
"So Much for Love"
"Bad Books"
"Pat the Almighty"
"Mutton"
"Fly"
"That Was Then, This Is Now"
"One to Call My Own"
"Puppets"
"Who am I?"
"Ghost of Elvis"
"No Place to Go"

References

External links
Whipping Boy on Amazon.com
Discography page on official website

2000 albums
Whipping Boy (Irish band) albums